Hemiboea is a genus of flowering plants belonging to the family Gesneriaceae.

Its native range is from Eastern Himalayas to Nansei-shoto (the Ryukyu Islands) and Vietnam. It is found in the regions of China, East Himalayas, Nansei-shoto, Taiwan and Vietnam.

The genus name of Hemiboea is in honour of François Beau (1723–1804), a clergyman. It was first described and published in Hooker's Icon. Pl. Vol.18: on table 1798 in 1888.

Species
According to Kew:

Hemiboea albiflora 
Hemiboea angustifolia 
Hemiboea bicornuta 
Hemiboea cavaleriei 
Hemiboea crystallina 
Hemiboea fangii 
Hemiboea flaccida 
Hemiboea follicularis 
Hemiboea gamosepala 
Hemiboea glandulosa 
Hemiboea gracilis 
Hemiboea integra 
Hemiboea latisepala 
Hemiboea longgangensis 
Hemiboea longisepala 
Hemiboea longzhouensis 
Hemiboea lutea 
Hemiboea magnibracteata 
Hemiboea malipoensis 
Hemiboea mollifolia 
Hemiboea omeiensis 
Hemiboea ovalifolia 
Hemiboea parvibracteata 
Hemiboea parviflora 
Hemiboea pingbianensis 
Hemiboea pseudomagnibracteata 
Hemiboea pterocaulis 
Hemiboea purpurea 
Hemiboea purpureotincta 
Hemiboea roseoalba 
Hemiboea rubribracteata 
Hemiboea sinovietnamica 
Hemiboea strigosa 
Hemiboea subacaulis 
Hemiboea subcapitata 
Hemiboea suiyangensis 
Hemiboea thanhhoensis 
Hemiboea wangiana

References

Didymocarpoideae
Gesneriaceae genera
Plants described in 1888
Flora of China
Flora of Taiwan
Flora of Vietnam